Distributed GIS refers to GI Systems that do not have all of the system components in the same physical location. This could be the processing, the database, the rendering or the user interface. It represents a special case of distributed computing, with examples of distributed systems including Internet GIS, Web GIS, and Mobile GIS. Distribution of resources provides corporate and enterprise-based models for GIS (involving multiple databases, different computers undertaking spatial analysis and a diverse ecosystem of often spatially-enabled client devices). Distributed GIS permits a shared services model, including data fusion (or mashups) based on Open Geospatial Consortium (OGC) web services. Distributed GIS technology enables modern online mapping systems (such as Google Maps and Bing Maps), Location-based services (LBS), web-based GIS (such as ArcGIS Online) and numerous map-enabled applications. Other applications include transportation, logistics, utilities, farm / agricultural information systems, real-time environmental information systems and the analysis of the movement of people. In terms of data, the concept has been extended to include volunteered geographical information. Distributed processing allows improvements to the performance of spatial analysis through the use of techniques such as parallel processing.

Etymology 
The term Distributed GIS was coined by Bruce Gittings at the University of Edinburgh. He was responsible for one of the first Internet-based distributed GIS. In 1994, he designed and implemented the World Wide Earthquake Locator, which provided maps of recent earthquake occurrences to a location-independent user, which used the Xerox PARC mapping system (based in California, USA), managed by an interface based in Edinburgh (Scotland), which drew data in real-time from the National Earthquake Information Center (USGS) in Colorado, USA.

Types

Organization GIS

Enterprise GIS
Enterprise GIS refers to a geographical information system that integrates geographic data across multiple departments and serves the whole organisation. The basic idea of an enterprise GIS is to deal with departmental needs collectively instead of individually. When organisations started using GIS in the 1960s and 1970s, the focus was on individual projects where individual users created and maintained data sets on their own desktop computers. Due to extensive interaction and work-flow between departments, many organisations have in recent years switched from independent, stand-alone GIS systems to more integrated approaches that share resources and applications.

Some of the potential benefits that an enterprise GIS can provide include significantly reduced redundancy of data across the system, improved accuracy and integrity of geographic information, and more efficient use and sharing of data. Since data is one of the most significant investments in any GIS program, any approach that reduces acquisition costs while maintaining data quality is important. The implementation of an enterprise GIS may also reduce the overall GIS maintenance and support costs providing a more effective use of departmental GIS resources. Data can be integrated and used in decision making processes across the whole organisation.

Corporate GIS 
A corporate Geographical Information System, is similar to Enterprise GIS and satisfies the spatial information needs of an organisation as a whole in an integrated manner. Corporate GIS consists of four technological elements which are data, standards, information technology and personnel with expertise. It is a coordinated approach that moves away from fragmented desktop GIS. The design of a corporate GIS includes the construction of a centralised corporate database that is designed to be the principle resource for an entire organisation. The corporate database is specifically designed to efficiently and effectively suit the requirements of the organisation. Essential to a corporate GIS is the effective management of the corporate database and the establishment of standards such as OGC for mapping and database technologies.

Benefits include that all the users in the organisation have access to shared, complete, accurate, high quality and up-to-date data. All the users in the organisation also have access to shared technology and people with expertise. This improves the efficiency and effectiveness of the organisation as a whole. A successfully managed corporate database reduces redundant collection and storage of information across the organisation. By centralising resources and efforts, it reduces the overall cost.

Internet GIS

Web GIS

Mobile GIS
With ~80% of all data deemed to have a spatial component, modern Mobile GIS are a powerful geo-centric business process integration platform enabling the Spatial Enterprise. The number of mobile devices in circulation has surpassed the world's population (2013) with a rapid acceleration in iOS, Android and Windows 8 tablet up-take. Tablets are fast becoming popular for Utility field use. Low-cost MIL-STD-810 certified cases transform consumer tablets into fully ruggedised, yet lightweight field use units at 10% of legacy ruggedised laptop costs.

Although not all applications of mobile GIS are limited by the device, many are. These limitations are more applicable to smaller devices such as cell phones and PDAs. Such devices have: small screens with a poor resolution, limited memory and processing power, a poor (or no) keyboard, and short battery life. Additional limitations can be found in web client based tablet applications: poor web GUI and device integration, on-line reliance, and very limited off-line web client cache.

Applications

Location-Based Services
Location-based services (LBS) are services that are distributed wirelessly and provide information relevant to the user's current location. These services include such things as ‘find my nearest …’, directions, and various vehicle monitoring systems, such as the GM OnStar system amongst others. Location-based services are generally run on mobile phones and PDAs, and are intended for use by the general public more than Mobile GIS systems which are geared towards commercial enterprise. Devices can be located by triangulation using the mobile phone network and/or GPS.

Web Mapping Services
A web mapping service is a means of displaying and interacting with maps on the Web. The first web mapping service was the Xerox PARC Map Viewer built in 1993 and decommissioned in 2000.

There have been 3 generations of web map service. The first generation was from 1993 onwards and consisted of simple image maps which had a single click function. The second generation was from 1996 onwards and still used image maps the one click function. However, they also had zoom and pan capabilities (although slow) and could be customised through the use of the URL API. The third generation was from 1998 onwards and were the first to include slippy maps. They utilise AJAX technology which enables seamless panning and zooming. They are customisable using the URL API and can have extended functionality programmed in using the DOM.

Web map services are based on the concept of the image map whereby this defines the area overlaying an image (e.g. GIF). An image map can be processed client or server side. As functionality is built into the web server, performance is good. Image maps can be dynamic. When image maps are used for geographic purposes, the co-ordinate system must be transformed to the geographical origin to conform to the geographical standard of having the origin at the bottom left corner. Web maps are used for location-based services.

Local search 

Local search is a recent approach to internet searching that incorporates geographical information into search queries so that the links that you return are more relevant to where you are. It developed out of an increasing awareness that many search engine users are using it to look for a business or service in the local area. Local search has stimulated the development of web mapping, which is used either as a tool to use in geographically restricting your search (see Live Search Maps) or as an additional resource to be returned along with search result listings (see Google Maps). It has also led to an increase in the number of small businesses 
advertising on the web.

Mashups
In distributed GIS, the term mashup refers to a generic web service which combines content and functionality from disparate sources; mashups reflect a separation of information and presentation. Mashups are increasingly being used in commercial and government applications as well as in the public domain. When used in GIS, it reflects the concept of connecting an application with a mapping service. An examples is combining Google maps with Chicago crime statistics to create the Chicago crime statistics map. Mashups are fast, provide value for money and remove responsibility for the data from the creator.

Second generation systems provide mashups mainly based on URL parameters, while Third generation systems (e.g. Google Maps) allow customisation via script (e.g. JavaScript).

Strategy
The development of the European Union (EU) Infrastructure for Spatial Information in the European Community (INSPIRE) initiative indicates this is a matter that is gaining more awareness at the national and EU scale. This states that there is a need to create ‘quality geo-referenced information’ that would be useful for a better understanding of human activities on environmental processes. Therefore, it is an ambitious project that aims to develop a European spatial information database.

The GI strategy for Scotland was introduced in 2005 to provide a sustainable SDI, through the ’’One Scotland – One Geography’’ implementation plan. This documentation notes that it should be able to provide linkages to the ’’Spaces, Faces and Places of Scotland’’. Although plans for a GI strategy have been in existence for some time, it was revealed at the AGI Scotland 2007 conference that a recent budget review by the Scottish Government indicated there will not be an allocation of resources to fund this initiative within the next term. Therefore, a business plan will need to be presented in order to outline the cost-benefits involved with taking up the strategy.

Standards
The main standards for Distributed GIS are provided by the Open Geospatial Consortium (OGC). OGC is a non-profit international group which seeks to Web-Enable GIS and in turn Geo-Enable the web. One of the major issues concerning distributed GIS is the interoperability of the data since it can come in different formats using different projection systems. OGC standards seek to provide interoperability between data and to integrate existing data.

OGC
In terms of interoperability, the use of communication standards in Distributed GIS is particularly important. General standards for Geospatial Data have been developed by the Open Geospatial Consortium (OGC). For the exchange of Geospatial Data over the web, the most important OGC standards are Web Map Service (WMS) and Web Feature Service (WFS).

Using OGC compliant gateways allows for building very flexible Distributed GI Systems. Unlike monolithic GI Systems, OGC compliant systems are naturally web-based and do not have strict definitions of servers and clients. For instance, if a user (client) accesses a server, that server itself can act as a client of a number of further servers in order to retrieve data requested by the user. This concept allows for data retrieval from any number of different sources, providing consistent data standards are used.
This concept allows data transfer with systems not capable of GIS functionality. A key function of OGC standards is the integration of different systems already existing and thus geo-enabling the web. Web services providing different functionality can be used simultaneously to combine data from different sources (mash-ups). Thus, different services on distributed servers can be combined for ‘service-chaining’ in order to add additional value to existing services. Providing a wide use of OGC standards by different web services, sharing distributed data of multiple organisations becomes possible.

Some important languages used in OGC compliant systems are described in the following. XML stands for eXtensible Markup language and is widely used for displaying and interpreting data from computers. Thus the development of a web-based GI system requires several useful XML encodings that can effectively describe two-dimensional graphics such as maps SVG and at the same time store and transfer simple features GML. Because GML and SVG are both XML encodings, it is very straightforward to convert between the two using an XML Style Language Transformation XSLT. This gives an application a means of rendering GML, and in fact is the primary way that it has been accomplished among existing applications today. XML can introduce innovative web services, in terms of GIS. It allows geographic information to be easily translated in graphic and in these terms scalar vector graphics (SVG) can produce high quality dynamic outputs by using data retrieved from spatial databases. In the same aspect Google, one of the pioneers in web-based GIS, has developed its own language which also uses a XML structure. Keyhole Markup Language (KML) is a file format used to display geographic data in an earth browser, such as Google Earth, Google Maps, and Google Maps for mobile browsers

Global System for Mobile Communications
Global System for Mobile Communications (GSM) is a global standard for mobile phones around the world. Networks using the GSM system offer transmission of voice, data and messages in text and multimedia form and provide web, telenet, ftp, email services etc. over the mobile network. Almost two million people are now using GSM. Five main standards of GSM exist: GSM 400, GSM 850, GSM 900, GSM-1800 (DCS) and GSM1900 (PCS). GSM 850 and GSM 1900 is used in North America, parts of Latin America and parts of Africa. In Europe, Asia and Australia GSM 900/1800 standard is used.

GSM consists of two components: the mobile radio telephone and Subscriber Identity Module. GSM is a cellular network, which is a radio network made up of a number of cells. For each cell, the transmitter (known as a base station) is transmitting and receiving signals. The base station is controlled through the Base Station Controller via the Mobile Switching Centre.

For GSM enhancement General Packet Radio Service (GPRS), a packet-oriented data service for data transmission, and Universal Mobile Telecommunications System (UTMS), the Third Generation (3G) mobile communication system, technology was introduced. Both provide similar services to 2G, but with greater bandwidth and speed.

Wireless Application Protocol
Wireless Application Protocol (WAP) is a standard for the data transmission of internet content and services. It is a secure specification that allows users to access the information instantly via mobile phones, pagers, two-way radios, smartphones and communicators. WAP supports HTML and XML, and WML language, and is specifically designed for small screens and one-hand navigation without a keyboard. WML is scalable from two-line text displays up to the graphical screens found on smart phones. It is much stricter than HTML and is similar to JavaScript.

Geotagging

Geotagging is the process of adding geographical identification metadata to resources such as websites, RSS feed, images or videos. The metadata usually consist of latitude and longitude coordinates but may also include altitude, camera holding direction, place information and so on. Flickr website is one of the famous web services which host photos and provides functionality to add latitude and longitude information to the picture. The main idea is to use metadata related to pictures and photo collection. A geotag is simply a properly-formed XML tag giving the geographic coordinates of a place. The coordinates can be specified in latitude and longitude or in UTM (Universal Transverse Mercator) coordinates.

The RDFIG Geo vocabulary from the W3C is the common basis for the recommendations. It supplies official global names for the latitude, longitude, and altitude properties. These are given in a system of coordinates known as "the WGS84 datum". A geographic datum specifies an ellipsoidal approximation to the Earth's surface; WGS84 is the most commonly used such datum.

Parallel Processing 
Parallel processing is the use of multiple CPU’s to execute different sections of a program together. Remote sensing and surveying equipment have been providing vast amounts of spatial information, and how to manage, process or dispose of this data have become major issues in the field of Geographic Information Science (GIS). To solve these problems there has been much research into the area of parallel processing of GIS information. This involves the utilization of a single computer with multiple processors or multiple computers that are connected over a network working on the same task. There are many different types of distributed computing, two of the most common are clustering and grid processing.

Some consider grid computing to be “the third information technology wave” after the Internet and Web, and will be the backbone of the next generation of services and applications that are going to further the research and development of GIS and related areas. Grid computing allows for the sharing of processing power, enabling the attainment of high performances in computing, management and services. Grid computing, (unlike the conventional supercomputer that does parallel computing by linking multiple processors over a system bus) uses a network of computers to execute a program.

The problem of using multiple computers lies in the difficulty of dividing up the tasks among the computers, without having to reference portions of the code being executed on other CPUs.
Amdahl's law expresses the speedup of a program as a result of parallelization.
It states that potential program speedup is defined by the fraction of code (P) that can be parallelized: 1/(1-P).
If the code cannot be broken up to run over multiple processors, P = 0 and the speedup = 1 (no speedup). If it is possible to break up the code to be perfectly parallel then P = 1 and the speedup is infinite, in theory though practical limits occur. Thus, there is an upper bound on the usefulness of adding more parallel execution units.
Gustafson's law is a law closely related to Amdahl's law but doesn't make as many assumptions and tries to model these factors in the representation of performance. The equation can be modelled by S(P) = P − α * (P − 1) where P is the number of processors, S is the speedup, and α the non-parallelizable part of the process.

The hadoop framework has been used successfully in GIS processing.

See also 

 AM/FM/GIS
 ArcGIS
 At-location mapping
 Automotive navigation system
 Cadastral map
 Collaborative mapping
 Comparison of GIS software
 Concepts and Techniques in Modern Geography
 Counter-mapping
 CyberGIS
 Digital geologic mapping
 Geographic information systems in geospatial intelligence
 Geomatics
 GIS and aquatic science
 GIS and public health
 GISCorps
 GIS Day
 GIS in archaeology
 GvSIG
 Historical GIS
 Integrated Geo Systems
 Internet GIS
 List of GIS data sources
 List of GIS software
 Map database management
 Participatory GIS
 QGIS
 SAGA GIS
 Spatial Data Infrastructure (SDI)
 Technical geography
 TerrSet
 Tobler's first law of geography
 Tobler's second law of geography
 Traditional knowledge GIS
 Virtual globe

References

Chan, T, O, Williamson, I, P. (1997) Definition of GIS: The manager's perspective. International Workshop on Dynamic and Multi-Dimensional GIS. Hong Kong, pp 18. DEFINITION OF GIS: THE MANAGER’S PERSPECTIVE
we-do-IT (2013): LatLonGO - Enabling the Spatial Enterprise. we-do-IT White Paper, Electronic document: 
ESRI (2003): Enterprise GIS for Municipal Government. ESRI White Paper. Electronic document: Wayback Machine
Ionita, A. (2006): Developing an Enterprise GIS. Electronic document: Developing an Enterprise GIS
Sipes, J.L. (2005): Spatial Technologies: Software Strategy: Options for the Enterprise. Electronic document: GIS | Cadalyst
Wayback Machine

Distributed Geographic Information Systems